Telikol is a lake in the Kyzylorda Region, Kazakhstan.

The area of the lake lies in the Syrdariya and Shieli districts. The Telikol lake zone includes a  Important Bird Area.

Geography
Telikol is a cluster of small lakes that lies close to the western edge of the Ashchykol Depression and east of the Daryalyktakyr plain (Дарьялыктакыр). The lakeshores are flat and wide.
In years of abundant spring floods, the Sarysu river flows into the Ashchykol Depression from the north, bends westwards, and reaches the Telikol from the east. In such years the water level rises in the whole area, connecting the lakes. The lake bottom is smooth, made up of clay and silt.

Flora
The Telikol lake area has sparse vegetation made up mainly of saltwort and wormwood, as well as saxaul and tamarisk. The western stretches of the lakeshores are covered with reeds. The grassy areas near the lakes are a seasonal grazing ground for local cattle.

See also
List of lakes of Kazakhstan

References

External links
Syrdarya Control and Northern Aral Sea Phase-11 (SYNAS-11) Project

Lake groups of Kazakhstan
Kyzylorda Region